The 2016 Canada Sevens was the fourth tournament within the 2015–16 World Rugby Women's Sevens Series. It was held over the weekend of 16–17 April 2016 at Westhills Stadium in Langford, Victoria, British Columbia.

Format
The teams were drawn into three pools of four teams each. Each team played everyone in their pool one time. The top two teams from each pool advanced to the Cup/Plate brackets while the top 2 third place teams will also compete in the Cup/Plate. The rest of the teams from each group went to the Bowl brackets.

Teams

Pool Stage

Pool A

Pool B

Pool C

Knockout stage

Bowl

Plate

Cup

References

External links
Official website

2016
Canada
Sevens
2016 in women's rugby union
Sevens
April 2016 sports events in Canada
Sports competitions in British Columbia